Noah Rubin was the defending champion but lost in the first round to Peter Polansky.

Reilly Opelka won the title after defeating Ruben Bemelmans 6–2, 4–6, 7–6(7–5) in the final.

Seeds

Draw

Finals

Top half

Bottom half

References
 Main Draw
 Qualifying Draw

Charlottesville Men's Pro Challenger - Singles
2016 Singles
Charlottesville